La ciudad de los niños ("The City of the Children") is a 1957 Mexican film. It stars Sara García.

External links
 

1957 films
Mexican drama films
1950s Spanish-language films
1950s Mexican films